Leuchars (pronounced  or ;  "rushes") is a small town and parish near the north-east coast of Fife in Scotland.

History
The name of the town derives from the Scottish Gaelic, Luachair, meaning "rushes", with an archaic Gaelic suffix -es that means "a place of", giving Luachaires, or "The Place of the Rushes". The Barony of Leuchars is recorded during the reign of William the Lion (1165–1214). The 12th-century St Athernase Church is one of the finest surviving examples of an unaisled Romanesque parish church in Scotland. The church has two levels of blind arcading in the Norman style running round the exterior, surmounted by a corbel table with heads of various designs. The interior has elaborate chancel and apse arches, and a series of powerful beast-heads on the corbels supporting the ribs of the internal vaults. The nave has been rebuilt, while the apse roof is crowned by a small bell-tower added in the 17th century. The medieval Leuchars Castle was located to the north of the town: it was demolished in the 19th century but the motte can still be seen, as well as a nearby doocot.

The surrounding area was improved by drainage in the 18th century. In the 19th century, a railway station on the line from Edinburgh to Aberdeen brought increased prosperity to the town. When the St Andrews Railway branch line was closed in the late 1960s, Leuchars became the closest place to get the train to St Andrews. Since then, Leuchars railway station has been used by many University of St Andrews students. In 1911 construction started on what would become RAF Leuchars. This Royal Air Force station would host a great variety of aircraft in its time, protecting the North of the United Kingdom from airborne threats until the final QRA (Quick Reaction Alert) aircraft of 1 Squadron departed RAF Leuchars in September 2014.  The Station has since been handed over to the Army as of March 2015. The station remains an RAF diversion airfield for aircraft in distress and QRA aircraft from RAF Lossiemouth.

Notable Residents

Rev Patrick Scougal was parish minister here 1645 to 1659 before moving to become Bishop of Aberdeen
His sons Henry Scougal and James Scougal, Lord Whitehill were raised here

Geography
The town is located near the north-eastern coast of Fife. The town has a population of 3,060.

The town had an adjoining Royal Air Force base, RAF Leuchars, which was established in 1920, and was home to the Eurofighter Typhoon. In 2015, the RAF base became an Army base, as the regimental headquarters of 2 Close Support Battalion REME and the Royal Scots Dragoon Guards, who saw their return to Scotland after 20 years in Germany, as coming home.

Climate
Leuchars has an oceanic climate, like most of Western Europe.

References

External links
 Comprehensive local website

 
Towns in Fife
Parishes in Fife